Sefid-Kooh is a mountain range of the Zagros Mountains System, located  to the south of Kermanshah in Kermanshah Province, western Iran. 

The watershed of the mountain is the separating line between two districts of Kermanshah, Dorood-Faraman and Sarfiroozabad of Mahidasht.

References
Kermanshahmiras.ir

Mountain ranges of Iran
Mountains of Kermanshah Province
Two-thousanders of Iran
Zagros Mountains
Mountains of Iran